Endless Flight is the fourth album by English singer-songwriter Leo Sayer, which was released in 1976.  It was released in the US and Canada by Warner Bros. Records and in the UK by Chrysalis Records.

The album consolidated his international popularity, reaching No. 4 in the UK and No. 10 in the USA; it also charted strongly in other countries including Sweden, Norway, the Netherlands, Australia and New Zealand, and was certified as a platinum album in both the UK and the USA, and double-platinum in Canada. The peak of his career came in 1977, when he scored two consecutive US number one hits, first with the disco-styled "You Make Me Feel Like Dancing" (a Grammy Award winner for the year's best Rhythm and Blues Song), followed by the romantic ballad, "When I Need You" (1977), which reached number one in both the UK and US. Written by Albert Hammond and Carole Bayer Sager, it was Sayer's first UK No. 1 single (after three number two hits). It was also the first of two UK chart-toppers in a row for producer Richard Perry.

Reception
This album received critical acclaim upon release, and won a Grammy Award for the hit single "You Make Me Feel Like Dancing."

Track listing

Side one
 "Hold On to My Love" (Barry Mann, Cynthia Weil, Sayer) - 3:08
 "You Make Me Feel Like Dancing" (Vini Poncia, Sayer) - 3:40
 "Reflections" (Holland-Dozier-Holland) - 3:07
 "When I Need You" (Albert Hammond, Carole Bayer Sager) – 4:08
 "No Business Like Love Business" (Brad Shapiro, Clarence Reid, Steve Alaimo, Willie Clarke) - 3:50

Side two
 "I Hear the Laughter" (Johnny Vastano, Sayer) - 3:13
 "Magdalena" (Danny O'Keefe) - 4:20
 "How Much Love" (Barry Mann, Sayer) - 3:35
 "I Think We Fell in Love Too Fast" (Johnny Vastano, Vini Poncia, Sayer) - 3:05
 "Endless Flight" (Andrew Gold) - 4:38

Personnel
Leo Sayer – guitar, harmonica, vocals
John Barnes – piano, clavinet
Bill Bodine – bass
Paul Buckmaster – synthesizer, cello, string arrangement, conductor
Auburn Burrell – guitar
Larry Carlton – rhythm guitar
Steve Gadd – drums
Bob Glaub – guitar, bass guitar 
Ed Greene – drums
Bobbye Hall – percussion
David Hungate – bass guitar
John Barlow Jarvis – piano
Mark T. Jordan – electric piano
Clydie King – backing vocals
Trevor Lawrence – horn
Bobby Keys – saxophone on "When I Need You"
Becky Lewis – backing vocals
Steve Madaio – horn
Sherlie Matthews – backing vocals
Andy Muson – bass guitar
Danny O'Keefe – performer
Nigel Olsson – drums
Michael Omartian – electric piano
Ray Parker Jr. – guitar
Dean Parks – Dobro, guitar, electric guitar
Bill Payne - electric piano
Jimmy Phillips – synthesizer, Mellotron
Jeff Porcaro – drums
Chuck Rainey – bass guitar
Lee Ritenour – guitar
Rick Shlosser – drums
Earl Slick – guitar on "Reflections", acoustic guitar on "I Hear the Laughter"
Leland Sklar – bass guitar 
John Vastano – guitar
Willie Weeks – bass guitar
Richard Tee – piano
James Newton Howard - synthesizer
Gene Page - string arrangements, conductor

Production
Record producer: Richard Perry
Engineers: Bill Schnee, Howard Steele
Photography: Elliot Gilbert

Charts

Weekly charts

Year-end charts

Awards

References

External links
 

1976 albums
Albums produced by Richard Perry
Chrysalis Records albums
Leo Sayer albums
Warner Records albums
albums arranged by Gene Page